Max Westphal (born 4 June 2003) is a French tennis player.

Westphal has a career high ATP singles ranking of 2009 achieved on 14 June 2021.

Westphal won the 2021 US Open – Boys' doubles title with Coleman Wong.

He currently attends Columbia University.

Junior Grand Slam titles

Doubles: 1 (1 title)

References

External links

2003 births
Living people
French male tennis players
US Open (tennis) junior champions
Columbia Lions men's tennis players
Grand Slam (tennis) champions in boys' doubles